is a passenger railway station located in the city of Inagi, Tokyo, Japan, operated by the private railway company, Keio Corporation.

Lines 

Station Layout
This station consists of two opposed elevated side platforms serving two tracks, with the station building located underneath.

Platforms

History
The station opened on October 18, 1974.

Passenger statistics
In fiscal 2019, the station was used by an average of 21,522 passengers daily. 

The passenger figures for previous years are as shown below.

Surrounding area
 Tama New Town
Inagi City Hall

See also
 List of railway stations in Japan

References

External links

Station page on official Keiō website - 

Railway stations in Tokyo
Railway stations in Japan opened in 1974
Keio Sagamihara Line
Stations of Keio Corporation
Inagi, Tokyo